The following is a complete list of books and stories published (and some unpublished) by Scott Sigler, a New York Times #1 bestselling American author of contemporary science fiction and horror. Sigler has published fourteen novels, including those in the Infected Trilogy, the Galactic Football League Series, and the Generations Trilogy. He has also co-authored four companion novellas to his Galactic Football League Series, with a few more novella projects underway. He has written nearly 50 short stories and other works, many of which have been compiled in book collections and anthologies.

Bibliography

Novels

Novellas

Collections

 All novels, novellas and collections have been released in both audiobook and e-book formats unless otherwise noted.

Other

External links
 Siglerpedia
 The online home of Scott Sigler

References

Bibliographies by writer
Bibliographies of American writers
Horror fiction bibliographies